The Way of the Exploding Fist is a 1985 fighting game based on Japanese martial arts developed by Beam Software, by a team consisting of Gregg Barnett, Bruce Bayley, Neil Brennan and David Johnston. Originally developed on the Commodore 64 and published in May 1985 by Melbourne House, ports were made for Amstrad CPC, ZX Spectrum, BBC Micro, Acorn Electron and Commodore 16.

Gameplay
The game has various backgrounds that change as the player progresses through the levels: inside a dojo, an outdoor field with snowy mountains and volcanoes, a Buddha statue, or some pagodas.

The player takes part in a series of one-on-one karate matches, all overseen by a wise old expert who appears in the background. Once the player defeats an opponent they move up to the next stage and a more difficult adversary. Fights are not won using the energy-bar style found in modern fighting games; instead, the player needed to get two complete yin-yangs. Any move that connected with the opponent would end the round; a loosely timed or borderline kick or punch would obtain half a yin-yang icon, while a well-executed move would obtain a full icon. Two complete icons ended the bout and progressed to the next level.

This system of scoring, known as shobu nihon kumite, is used in real life in many traditional styles of karate. A half yin-yang represents a waza-ari (a committed but not decisive technique) and a full yin-yang represents an ippon score (full point, decisive finishing blow).

The game control is via joystick or direction keys and a "fire" key. 18 different movements can be made, including jumping kick, roundhouse kick and a variety of punches and kicks, high and low. The game features a variety of backgrounds against which the fighting takes place. After completing a number of progressively harder stages, the player is charged at by a bull in a bonus round. The player must knock the bull out with a single hit. The bonus round mirrors the feats of Mas Oyama, a karate expert who purportedly killed bulls with a single strike. This bonus round was not present in the ZX Spectrum version and some of the early Commodore 64 versions.

Production
Before creating The Way of the Exploding Fist, designer Gregg Barnett converted The Hobbit and Sherlock, two adventures from Beam Software, to the Commodore 64. It was one of the first games to borrow heavily from the Data East arcade game Karate Champ, which was released the previous year. The Commodore 64 version uses over 600 sprite images to animate the player's movements. Karate champion Jeoffrey Thompson was signed to promote the game but was not sufficiently well known to have the game named after him. A Nintendo Entertainment System version was developed by Beam Software but it was never released.

The game's soundtrack was written by Neil Brennan and it is based on the 1952 orchestral piece Dance of the Yao People. It has been praised for the excellent atmosphere it provided and was one reason behind the popularity of the game.

Reception

The Way of the Exploding Fist topped the UK software sales charts for two months, in September and October 1985, until it was replaced by Monty on the Run.

The Way of the Exploding Fist became the best-selling computer game of 1985 in the UK, and sold a total of 500,000 copies in Europe.

The Commodore 64 version received a positive review in Zzap!64 magazine, which called it a "Sizzler" and praised the game's sound and graphics, scoring it 93% overall. Your Sinclair reviewers praised the visceral sound effects.

Accolades
The game was voted Game of the Year at the third Golden Joystick Awards, with Melbourne House picking up Best Software House. It also received the "Voted Best Game" award at the Saturday Superstore Viewer Awards. The ZX Spectrum version was placed at number 67 on the "Your Sinclair official top 100" list in 1991. In 1996, GamesMaster ranked the game 76th on their "Top 100 Games of All Time".

Sequels
There were three sequels: Fist II: The Legend Continues (1986) and Fist II: The Tournament (1987) and Exploding Fist +. Of these three, Fist II: The Legend Continues is not a fighting game involving player-versus-player, but a scrolling adventure game with one-on-one fighting elements. Exploding Fist +, on the other hand, returns to the style of the first game. It features combat with three characters, an idea followed from International Karate +, though in this case it is possible for players to control the three characters simultaneously.

References

External links
 
 
 
 The Way of the Exploding Fist on c64-wiki.com

1985 video games
Amstrad CPC games
BBC Micro and Acorn Electron games
Commodore 16 and Plus/4 games
Commodore 64 games
Fighting games
Golden Joystick Award for Game of the Year winners
Japan in non-Japanese culture
Karate video games
Video games developed in Australia
Video games set in Japan
ZX Spectrum games